is a former Japanese football player.

Playing career
Suzuki was born in Fujieda on June 1, 1982. After graduating from high school, he joined J2 League club Shonan Bellmare in 2001. He became a regular player from first season. Although he played many matches from 2002, his opportunity to play decreased for injuries and he left the club end of 2005 season. After a half year blank, he joined Mito HollyHock in August 2006. He played many matches until 2008 and retired end of 2008 season.

Club statistics

References

External links

1982 births
Living people
Association football people from Shizuoka Prefecture
Japanese footballers
J2 League players
Shonan Bellmare players
Mito HollyHock players
Association football midfielders
People from Fujieda, Shizuoka